John Fraser Muth (September 27, 1930 – October 23, 2005) was an American economist. He is "the father of the rational expectations revolution in economics", primarily due to his article "Rational Expectations and the Theory of Price Movements" from 1961.

Muth earned his PhD in mathematical economics from Carnegie Mellon University, and was in 1954 the first recipient of the Alexander Henderson Award. He was affiliated with Carnegie Mellon as a research associate from 1956 until 1959, as an assistant professor from 1959 to 1962, and as an associate professor without tenure from 1962 to 1964. He was a full professor at Michigan State University from 1964 to 1969 and a full professor at Indiana University from 1969 until his retirement in 1994.

Muth asserted that expectations "are essentially the same as the predictions of the relevant economic theory." Although he formulated the rational expectations principle in the context of microeconomics it has subsequently become associated with macroeconomics and the work of Robert Lucas, Jr., Finn E. Kydland, Edward C. Prescott, Neil Wallace, Thomas J. Sargent, and others.

Rationalization of Friedman's adaptive expectations model
Phillip Cagan, Milton Friedman and others used the ad hoc updating rule which they labeled adaptive expectations to forecast the hidden state y* (e.g., permanent income). In a 1960 paper, Muth answered the question: for what stochastic process for y will adaptive expectations as postulated by Cagan and Friedman be the optimal forecast of y*. Muth's approach to find recursive optimal linear forecast of a "hidden" state vector, x, given an "observer", y is very similar to the Kalman filter, presented by Rudolf Kálmán in his paper from the same year.

In his paper "Optimal Properties of Exponentially Weighted Forecasts", which was published in the Journal of the American Statistical Association in 1960, Muth rationalized Friedman's adaptive expectations model for permanent income. He did this by reverse engineering a stochastic process for income for which Cagan's expectation formula equals a mathematical expectation of future values conditioned on the infinite history of past incomes. Among Muth's insights was that the stochastic process being forecast should dictate both the distributed lag and the conditioning variables that people use to forecast the future.

Hypothesis of rational expectations
In "Rational Expectations and the Theory of Price Movements", published in 1961, Muth put forward his hypothesis, in contrast to Simon, that "expectations, since they are informed predictions of future events, are essentially the same as the predictions of the relevant economic theory." Muth continued, "At the risk of confusing this purely descriptive hypothesis with a pronouncement as to what firms ought to do, we call such expectations rational."

Legacy
Muth's works influenced almost every area of economic research into dynamic problems.

Major works
 Charles C. Holt, Franco Modigliani, John F. Muth, and Herbert A. Simon (1960). Planning Production, Inventories, and Work Force.
 John F. Muth. (1960). "Optimal Properties of Exponentially Weighted Forecasts", Journal of the American Statistical Association, 55(290), pp.  299–306.
 John F. Muth. (1961). "Rational Expectations and the Theory of Price Movements", Econometrica 29, pp. 315–335.

External links
 
 , Remembering the Man Behind Rational Expectations, obituary of John F. Muth

1930 births
2005 deaths
New classical economists
20th-century American economists
Carnegie Mellon University faculty
Fellows of the Econometric Society
Carnegie Mellon University alumni
Probability theorists